D'Arcy Galt (23 June 1918 – 24 September 1994) was a Trinidadian cricketer. He played in seven first-class matches for Trinidad and Tobago from 1938 to 1948.

See also
 List of Trinidadian representative cricketers

References

External links
 

1918 births
1994 deaths
Trinidad and Tobago cricketers